All Eyez on Me is a 1996 double album by 2Pac.

All Eyez on Me may also refer to:

 "All Eyez On Me", the 2Pac album's title track featuring Big Syke
 All Eyez on Me (Monica album), 2002 studio album by Monica
 "All Eyez on Me" (song), the Monica album's title track
 All Eyez on Me (film), 2017 biographical drama film about rapper Tupac Shakur

See also
All Eyes on Me (disambiguation)